Jourdanton High School is a public high school located in Jourdanton, Texas (USA) and classified as a 3A school by the UIL. It is part of the Jourdanton Independent School District located in central Atascosa County. In 2015, the school was rated "Mid" by the Texas Education Agency.

Athletics
The Jourdanton Indians compete in these sports 
Baseball
Basketball
Cross Country
Football
Golf
Marching Band
Powerlifting
Softball
Tennis
Track and Field
Volleyball

State Titles
Girls Basketball - 
1966(1A)
Volleyball - 
1966(1A)

Band
The Indian Band, nicknamed "The Pride of Atascosa County", is composed of around 130 JHS students as of October 2014.

References

External links
 Jourdanton ISD

Schools in Atascosa County, Texas
Public high schools in Texas